Narkurs is a hamlet in the south east of Cornwall, England. It is part of the civil parish of Deviock. It is about 2 km southeast of Hessenford. Historically an agricultural settlement, Narkurs has become smaller as this industry has declined, and in 2007 consisted of only 20 homes.

References

Hamlets in Cornwall